The State Register of Heritage Places is maintained by the Heritage Council of Western Australia. , 172 places are heritage-listed in the Shire of Narembeen, of which five are on the State Register of Heritage Places.

List
The Western Australian State Register of Heritage Places, lists the following five state registered places within the Shire of Narembeen:

References

Narembeen
Narembeen